Dead to Rights is a video game series.

Dead to Rights may also refer to:

Dead to Rights (video game), a 2002 video game
Dead to Rights (Game Boy Advance), a version of the 2002 game
"Dead to Rights" (Arrow), an episode from season 1 of Arrow

See also